is a city located in Shiga Prefecture, Japan. , the city had an estimated population of 116,043 in 46858 households and a population density of 120 persons per km².

Geography
Nagahama is located on the northern shore of Lake Biwa and occupies most of the northern portion of Shiga Prefecture. It is generally bounded by the Ibuki Mountains to the east, the Nosaka Mountains to the north and Lake Biwa to the south. The city is the second largest in the prefecture in terms of land area, after Takashima. The inland areas of the city are noted for very heavy snow accumulation in winter

Neighboring municipalities 
Shiga Prefecture
Maibara
Takashima
Gifu Prefecture
Ibigawa
Fukui Prefecture
Tsuruga
Echizen

Climate
Nagahama has a Humid subtropical climate (Köppen Cfa) characterized by warm summers and cool winters with light to no snowfall.  The average annual temperature in Nagahama is 12.0 °C. The average annual rainfall is 2052 mm with September as the wettest month. The temperatures are highest on average in August, at around 24.0 °C, and lowest in January, at around 0.3 °C.

Demographics
Per Japanese census data, the population of Nagahama has remained relatively stable over the past 70 years.

History
Nagahama is part of ancient  Ōmi Province and has been settled since at least the Yayoi period. During the Sengoku period, the area was contested between the Kyogoku clan, Azai clan and Asakura clan. The city center was developed and renamed by Toyotomi Hideyoshi when Hideyoshi moved the center of his administration from Odani Castle. Kunitomo (国友), the northeast of the city center, had been known for the production of arquebuses and guns since 1544. The settlement was originally called Imahama (今濱), but  Hideyoshi renamed it "Nagahama", taking one kanji from the name of his overlord, Oda Nobunaga. It is not related to the area of the same name in Fukuoka City and same name town in Ehime Prefecture. In the Edo period, it was largely under the control of Hikone Domain under the Tokugawa shogunate; however, the jin'ya of Ōmi-Miyagawa Domain, a 13,000 koku feudal holding under a cadet branch of the Hotta clan was located in what is now southeastern Nagahama. After the Meiji restoration, the town of Nagahama was established within Sakata District, Shiga with the creation of the modern municipalities system. 

On April 1, 1943, Nagahama annexed the neighboring villages of Kamiteru, Rokusho, Minamigori, Kitagori, Nishikuroda and Kanda to form the city of Nagahama. On February 13, 2006, the towns of Azai and Biwa (both from Higashiazai District) were merged into Nagahama. On January 1, 2010, the towns of Kohoku and Torahime (both from Higashiazai District), and the towns of Kinomoto, Nishiazai, Takatsuki and Yogo (all from Ika District) were merged into Nagahama. Both districts were thereby dissolved as a result of this merger.

The current city thus consists of areas once within three former districts; Sakata District, Higashiazai District and Ika District.

Government
Nagahama has a mayor-council form of government with a directly elected mayor and a unicameral city council of 26 members. Nagahama contributes four members to the Shiga Prefectural Assembly. In terms of national politics, the city is part of Shiga 2nd district of the lower house of the Diet of Japan.

Economy
The economy of Nagahama is centered on agriculture and light manufacturing.

Education
Nagahama has 23 public elementary schools and ten public middle schools and two combined elementary/middle schools operated by the city government. There are five public high schools operated by the Shiga Prefectural Department of Education. The prefecture also operates two special education schools for the handicapped. 

International schools:
 Colégio Sun Family - Brazilian primary school

Transportation

Railway
 JR West – Hokuriku Main Line
  -  -   -  -  - 
 JR West – Kosei Line
  -

Highway
  Hokuriku Expressway

Sister city

Within Japan 
 Nishinoomote, Kagoshima
 Tatsuno, Hyōgo

Outside Japan 
  Augsburg, Bavaria, Germany
  Verona, Veneto, Italy
  Holland, Michigan (informal)

Sightseeing 
 Central Nagahama
 Nagahama Castle
 Kurokabe Square (aka "Black Wall Square"), shopping streets centered a black wall glasswork shop which made use of an old bank building.
 The Old Nagahama Station Museum, built in 1882 and the oldest preserved railroad station in Japan.
 The Nagahama Roman Beer Brewery
 Nagahama Flintlock Gun Museum
 Nagahama Hachimangu Shrine
 Daitsū-ji Temple, the largest temple in central Nagahama
 Shana-in Temple
 Soji-ji Temple
 Jinsho-ji Temple
 Chizen-in Temple
 Hōkoku Shrine
 Nagahama Hikiyama Festival event on April 13–16, every year, since Azuchi-Momoyama period.
 Nagahama Bonbai (bonsai of ume) event on January 20 to March 10, every year, since 1952.
 Tonda Traditional Bunraku Puppet Troupe
 Lake Biwa
 Chikubu Island
 Odani Castle
 Anegawa River
 Mount Shizugatake

Cuisine 

Noted people from Nagahama
Kenichiro Ueno, politician

Gallery

References

External links 

  
 Nagahama Tourism Association 

Cities in Shiga Prefecture
Nagahama, Shiga